Elvis: A Legendary Performer is the title of a series of four compilation albums featuring recordings by American singer Elvis Presley. Released by RCA Records between 1974 and 1983, the albums contained varying amounts of previously released and previously unreleased recordings from Presley's career. RCA also created Legendary Performer albums for other recording artists, but the Presley series was the longest-running.

 Elvis: A Legendary Performer Volume 1 (1974)
 Elvis: A Legendary Performer Volume 2 (1976)
 Elvis: A Legendary Performer Volume 3 (1979)
 Elvis: A Legendary Performer Volume 4 (1983)

Elvis Presley compilation albums
Compilation album series